Clyde is an unincorporated community located in the town of Clyde, Iowa County, Wisconsin, United States. The community was named by Seth Champion, a director of the Kewaunee, Green Bay & Western railroad in the 1890s, for his son Clyde.

References

Unincorporated communities in Iowa County, Wisconsin
Unincorporated communities in Wisconsin